Oceana Wu (born on 29 August 1993) is a Taiwanese actress under Enjoy Entertainment Co. She is best known for her role in the television series, Hello Again!

Background
Oceana was first scouted during her university years while working part-time at a restaurant. Upon graduation from Chinese Culture University (in the department of Chinese language and literature), she moved to China and began her acting career in web dramas. In 2017, following completion of her contract, Oceana returned to Taiwan and signed with her current company — Enjoy Entertainment Co. Her role in the television series, Hello Again!, garnered many positive views from the public.

Filmography

Television series

Films

Music videos

References

External links 

 
 

1993 births
21st-century Taiwanese actresses
Living people
Taiwanese television actresses